Calcium oxalate (in archaic terminology, oxalate of lime) is a calcium salt of oxalic acid with the chemical formula . It forms hydrates , where n varies from 1 to 3. Anhydrous and all hydrated forms are colorless or white. The monohydrate  occurs naturally as the mineral whewellite, forming envelope-shaped crystals, known in plants as raphides. The two rarer hydrates are dihydrate , which occurs naturally as the mineral weddellite, and trihydrate , which occurs naturally as the mineral caoxite, are also recognized.  Some foods have high quantities of calcium oxalates and can produce sores and numbing on ingestion and may even be fatal.  Tribes with diets that depend highly on fruits and vegetables high in calcium oxalate, such as in Micronesia, reduce the level of it by boiling and cooking them. They are a constituent in 76% of human kidney stones. Calcium oxalate is also found in beerstone, a scale that forms on containers used in breweries.

Occurrence
Many plants accumulate calcium oxalate as it has been reported in more than 1000 different genera of plants. The calcium oxalate accumulation is linked to the detoxification of calcium in the plant. Upon decomposition, the calcium oxalate is oxidised by bacteria, fungi, or wildfire to produce the soil nutrient calcium carbonate.

The poisonous plant dumb cane (Dieffenbachia) contains the substance and on ingestion can prevent speech and be suffocating. It is also found in sorrel, rhubarb (in large quantities in the leaves), cinnamon, turmeric and in species of Oxalis, Araceae, Arum italicum, taro, kiwifruit, tea leaves, agaves, Virginia creeper (Parthenocissus quinquefolia), and Alocasia and in spinach in varying amounts. Plants of the genus Philodendron contain enough calcium oxalate that consumption of parts of the plant can result in uncomfortable symptoms. Insoluble calcium oxalate crystals are found in plant stems, roots, and leaves and produced in idioblasts. Vanilla plants exude calcium oxalates upon harvest of the orchid seed pods and may cause contact dermatitis.

Calcium oxalate, as ‘beerstone’, is a brownish precipitate that tends to accumulate within vats, barrels, and other containers used in the brewing of beer. If not removed in a cleaning process, beerstone will leave an unsanitary surface that can harbour microorganisms. Beerstone is composed of calcium and magnesium salts and various organic compounds left over from the brewing process; it promotes the growth of unwanted microorganisms that can adversely affect or even ruin the flavour of a batch of beer.

Calcium oxalate crystals in the urine are the most common constituent of human kidney stones, and calcium oxalate crystal formation is also one of the toxic effects of ethylene glycol poisoning.

Chemical properties 
Calcium oxalate is a combination of calcium ions and the conjugate base of oxalic acid, the oxalate anion. Its aqueous solutions are slightly basic because of the basicity of the oxalate ion. The basicity of calcium oxalate is weaker than that of sodium oxalate, due to its lower solubility in water.  Solid calcium oxalate hydrate has been characterized by X-ray crystallography.  It is a coordination polymer featuring planar oxalate anions linked to calcium, which also has water ligands.

Medical significance
Calcium oxalate can produce sores and numbing on ingestion and may even be fatal.

Morphology and diagnosis
The monohydrate and dihydrate can be distinguished by the shape of the respective crystals. 
 Calcium oxalate dihydrate crystals are octahedral. A large portion of the crystals in a urine sediment will have this type of morphology, as they can grow at any pH and naturally occur in normal urine.
 Calcium oxalate monohydrate crystals vary in shape, and can be shaped like dumbbells, spindles, ovals, or picket fences, the last of which is most commonly seen due to ethylene glycol poisoning.

Kidney stones

About 76% of kidney stones are partially or entirely of the calcium oxalate type. They form when urine is persistently saturated with calcium and oxalate. Between 1% and 15% of people globally are affected by kidney stones at some point. In 2015, they caused about 16,000 deaths worldwide.

Some of the oxalate in urine is produced by the body. Calcium and oxalate in the diet play a part but are not the only factors that affect the formation of calcium oxalate stones. Dietary oxalate is an organic ion found in many vegetables, fruits, and nuts. Calcium from bone may also play a role in kidney stone formation.

In one study of modulators of calcium oxalate crystallization in urine, magnesium-alkali citrate was shown to inhibit CaOx (calcium oxalate) crystallization, “probably via actions of the citrate, but not the Mg.” This was in comparison to magnesium, citrate, and magnesium citrate. Currently the preparation of magnesium-potassium citrate that was used in one positive study is not available in the United States.

Industrial applications
Calcium oxalate is used in the manufacture of ceramic glazes.

See also
 Magnesium oxalate
 Oxalic acid
 Sodium oxalate

References

Oxalates
Calcium compounds
Kidney